The Arverni (Gaulish: *Aruernoi) were a Gallic people dwelling in the modern Auvergne region during the Iron Age and the Roman period. They were one of the most powerful tribes of ancient Gaul, contesting primacy over the region with the neighbouring Aedui.

They are mentioned in 207 BC as treating with Carthaginian commandant Hasdrubal Barca. Headed by their chiefs Luernius and Bituitus, the Arverni were at the head of an extensive empire. After Bituitus was defeated by Domitius Ahenobarbus and Fabius Maximus in 121 BC, the Arvernian empire was reduced to suzerainty over some neighbouring tribes.

In 52 BC, during the Gallic Wars, the Arvernian chief Vercingetorix led the Gallic revolt against the armies of Caesar. After an initial victory at the Battle of Gergovia, Vercingetorix was defeated by the Romans at the Battle of Alesia, after which the Arverni lost their power of suzerainty. They maintained however a status of civitas libera, and remained a prosperous tribe during the Roman period. Under emperor Augustus, their capital was moved from Gergovia to Augustonemetum (present-day Clermont-Ferrand).

Following Alemannic invasions of the region in the 3rd century AD, Clermont-Ferrand was reduced in size but remained an important centre during the later part of the Roman period. In 475, despite a heroic struggle led by their bishop, Sidonius Apollinaris, the Arvernian territory was eventually ceded to the Visigoths.

Name 
They are mentioned as Arvernos by Caesar (mid-1st c. BC), Arvernorum by Livy (late-1st c. BC), A̓roúernoi (Ἀρούερνοι) by Strabo (early 1st c. AD), and as A̓rouernō͂n (Ἀρουερνῶν) by Ptolemy (2nd c. AD).

The ethnonym Arverni is a latinized form of Gaulish *Aruernoi (sing. *Aruernos). Its etymology remains unclear. Pierre-Yves Lambert has suggested to interpret it as "those who are above", by decomposing the name as *ar(e)-uer-no- (cf. Latin supernus). Alternatively, a connection with the Gaulish stem *uernā- ("alder"; c.f. French vergne, Occitan verne) has also been proposed.

The region of Auvergne, attested in 511 as ecclesiae Arvenicae (pagus Arvenicus or pago Alvernio in the 9th c., Alvernhe ca. 1071–1127) is named after the Gallic tribe.

Geography 

It is assumed that the pre-Roman territory of the Arverni roughly corresponded to the limits of the Roman-era civitas Arvernorum, later inherited by the early medieval Diocese of Clermont. Their territory would has thus encompassed the modern departements of Puy-de-Dôme and Cantal, parts of Haute-Loire and Allier, as well as small areas of Creuse, Loire and Aveyron.

They dwelled east of the Lemovices and Petrocorii, south of the Bituriges Cubi and Aedui, north of the Ruteni, Cadurci and Vellavi, and west of the Segusiavi and Ambarri.

History

Early history
The Arverni are known to have had the most powerful tribal hegemony in Gaul during the 3rd and 2nd centuries BC under their kings, Luernius, and his son Bituitus. Their power was based on strong metallurgic technologies and weapons, elaborated and rich agriculture and catering, mining, trade and military dominance over their neighbours with tributes paid to them.

But when Arverni king Bituitus was defeated by the Romans of Quintus Fabius and Gnaeus Ahenobarbus in 121 BC at the climactic Battle of the Isère River, their ascendancy passed to the Aedui and Sequani. 
Unlike the Allobroges, who were brought under direct Roman rule as a result of the Celtic wars of the 120s, the Arverni negotiated a treaty that preserved their independence, though their territory was diminished.

No further Arvernian kings are mentioned in the historical record between 121 BC and 52 BC, and they may have adopted a constitutional oligarchy at this time. 
However, there were at least two later attempts to re-establish rulership by Celtillus and Vercingetorix. The defeat of the Arverni under Bituitus led directly to the establishment of Gallia Narbonensis as a Roman province, referred to simply as the Provincia so often that a part of the ancient region is today known as Provence.

The King Luernius was mentioned in writing by the Greek ethnographer Posidonius. Luernius was known to have scattered gold and silver coins to his followers while riding in his chariot. Under Luernius, the Arverni were at the head of a formidable Gallic military hegemony which stretched from the Rhine to the Atlantic coast.

They joined Bellovesus' migrations towards Italy, together with the Aedui, Ambarri, Aulerci, Carnutes and Senones.

Gallic Wars

The Arverni later played an important role in the Gallic Wars of Julius Caesar from 58 BC to 51 BC. At first the Arvenian nobles tried to avoid confronting Caesar during his early incursions. They executed the leader Celtillus, evidently for trying to gain sovereignty over all the Gauls. In 52 BC, Celtillus' son Vercingetorix rallied his supporters to fight the Romans, but was expelled from Gergovia by the nobles, including his uncle Gobanitio. He then raised a great army in the country, and returned to the city where he ejected his opponents and was declared king. This accomplished, Vercingetorix forged an alliance with at least 15 Gallic tribes, requesting the presence of sons of chiefs to prove their alliance. He then led the majority of the Gauls and won the Gergovia battle against Julius Caesar and his cavalry did marvels in pursuing the Roman troops.
Having earlier split his forces, Caesar awaited their return while receiving supplies from allied Gauls. Vercingetorix was then defeated by Caesar at the Battle of Alesia, after several months where the legions built 14 ranges of military equipment around the city to lay siege upon the Gallic soldiers. After several weeks of support from the western Gallic people with large numbers of troops coming to support Vercingetorix from outside the city, the Gauls were close to merging the inner and outer forces on 2 occasions. When the outer forces decided to depart, Vercingetorix took the decision to surrender himself to the Romans in order to save the people of Alesia.

Roman period

In the aftermath of the Gallic Wars the Arverni soldiers were pardoned and its senate was restored to power. The Arverni and the majority of other Gaulish states were pulled into the Roman political hemisphere but retained full rights and home rule. According to Gregory of Tours and his book Historia Francorum ("History of the Franks") the Arverni senators were still active in the sixth century and were deeply involved in the politics of the nascent Frankish state.

See also
 Auvergne
 Auvergnat
Quintus Fabius Maximus Allobrogicus: conquered King Bituitus
Alba Fucens: town where Bituitus was held after capture

References

Bibliography

Further reading

 
Gauls
Tribes of pre-Roman Gaul
Tribes involved in the Gallic Wars
History of Auvergne
Historical Celtic peoples